The Knoxville Knights  were a minor professional ice hockey team based in the James White Civic Coliseum in Knoxville, Tennessee. The Knights played for seven seasons in the Eastern Hockey League from 1961 to 1968. The Knights folded at the end of the 1967–68 season.
The Knights had the distinction of having the youngest player in EHL history appear in a game during their existence. On March 13, 1966 in a game against the Jacksonville Rockets, Knights head coach Doug Bentley inserted his son Doug, Jr. into the lineup after a rash of injuries hit the team a few days before. Doug, Jr, was born June 1, 1951, making him 14 years of age at the time of his Knights debut.

They were followed in Knoxville by the Knoxville Cherokees of the ECHL from 1988 to 1997, the Knoxville Speed of the UHL from 1999 to 2002, and the Knoxville Ice Bears of the ACHL, the SEHL, and the SPHL from 2002 to the present.

Knights in the NHL

Former members of the Knights include several players who played in the NHL.

Gene Achtymichuk
Glen Cressman
Ray Cullen
Claude Cyr
Eddie Dorohoy
Marv Edwards
Harrison Gray
Earl HeiskalaDennis Hextall
Jack LeClair
Jack Martin
Jim Murray
Pat Quinn
Bill Speer
Guy Trottier
Les Calder
Don LaBelle

Season-by-season results

External links
hockeyDB.com – Knoxville Knights season standings
hockeyDB.com – All-time roster for the Knoxville Knights of the EHL
Legends of Hockey – NHL Player Search – Players By Team – Knoxville Knights

Sports in Knoxville, Tennessee
Eastern Hockey League teams
Defunct ice hockey teams in the United States
Ice hockey teams in Tennessee
Ice hockey clubs established in 1961
Sports clubs disestablished in 1968
1961 establishments in Tennessee
1968 disestablishments in Tennessee
Philadelphia Flyers minor league affiliates